The 1968 British League season was the 34th season of the top tier of speedway in the United Kingdom and the fourth season known as the British League.

Summary
Edinburgh relocated to become the Coatbridge Monarchs. The Long Eaton team closed its doors, but a new team in Leicester returned to Speedway to join the League.

Coventry Bees secured their first title on points difference and after they scored points in the last heat of their last match away at King's Lynn. The title win came after two consecutive years as being runner-up. Coventry's Nigel Boocock was again one of the league's leading riders with his average going well above ten for the fifth consecutive year. He was well supported by Ron Mountford and Czechoslovakian star Antonín Kasper Sr. Wimnledon Dons who could only manage a mid table finish went on to win the British League Knockout Cup.

Final table
M = Matches; W = Wins; D = Draws; L = Losses; Pts = Total Points

British League Knockout Cup
The 1968 British League Knockout Cup was the 30th edition of the Knockout Cup for tier one teams. Wimbledon were the winners.

First round

Second round

Third round

Semi-finals

Final

First leg

Second leg

Wimbledon Dons were declared Knockout Cup Champions, winning on aggregate 118-98.

Final leading averages

Riders & final averages
Belle Vue

 9.13
 8.50
 7.40
 7.34
 5.62
 5.56
 4.48
 4.29
 3.65
 2.78

Coatbridge

 9.28 
 9.02
 6.48 
 6.36 
 6.05
 4.39
 3.62

Coventry

 10.74
 9.62
 7.51 
 7.09 
 6.46
 6.13
 5.46
 4.73
 3.40
 1.88

Cradley Heath

 8.91
 7.70
 6.71
 6.32
 6.20
 5.67
 5.02
 5.02
 4.19
 3.62
 3.16

Exeter

 10.72 
 7.70
 7.51 
 7.46
 7.31
 6.37
 5.71
 4.64

Glasgow

 8.31
 7.91 
 7.43
 6.79
 5.78
 5.68
 4.92
 4.79
 4.17
 2.37

Hackney

 9.58
 8.99 
 6.74
 6.24
 6.08
 5.31
 4.40
 4.08
 3.17

Halifax

 10.17
 8.83
 7.95
 6.27
 5.94
 5.43
 3.88
 3.75
 3.69

King's Lynn

 9.45
 9.40 
 6.11
 (Kid Bodie) 5.94
 5.24
 5.10
 4.34
 4.29
 4.00

Leicester

 10.19
 9.37
 6.62
 5.51
 5.43
 5.24
 4.06
 2.80
 2.58

Newcastle'

 11.37 
 9.39 
 6.86
 6.08
 5.76
 5.48
 5.09
 5.05
 3.67
 3.56
 2.24

Newport

 9.73
 7.97
 6.56
 6.47
 6.26 
 5.69
 5.72
 2.00

Oxford

 8.53
 7.32
 6.87 
 6.58
 5.52 
 4.38
 2.77

Poole

 8.32
 7.67
 7.46
 6.94
 5.71
 5.25
 5.14
 4.53
 4.36

Sheffield

 10.07 
 7.97
 7.54
 6.79
 6.39 
 6.13
 4.76
 1.49

Swindon

 10.87
 8.51
 8.20
 6.18
 5.99
 5.25
 4.94
 4.29

West Ham

 9.78
 9.71
 9.11
 5.36
 4.95
 4.46
 3.33
 2.57

Wimbledon

 9.31
 9.15
 7.93
 5.87
 5.61
 5.49
 5.18
 3.54

Wolverhampton

 9.58
 9.24
 7.68
 6.82
 5.97
 4.86
 4.30
 2.86
 2.35
 2.29

See also
List of United Kingdom Speedway League Champions
Knockout Cup (speedway)

References

British League
1968 in British motorsport
1968 in speedway